These lists cover volcanoes by type and by location.

Type
 List of extraterrestrial volcanoes
 List of largest volcanic eruptions
 List of shield volcanoes
 List of stratovolcanoes

Location

Africa 

List of volcanoes in Algeria
List of volcanoes in Cameroon
List of volcanoes in Cape Verde
List of volcanoes in Chad
List of volcanoes in the Comoros
List of volcanoes in the Democratic Republic of the Congo
List of volcanoes in Djibouti
List of volcanoes in Equatorial Guinea
List of volcanoes in Eritrea
List of volcanoes in Ethiopia
List of volcanoes in Kenya
List of volcanoes in Libya
List of volcanoes in Madagascar
In Nigeria all the volcanoes are in the Biu Plateau
List of volcanoes in Réunion
List of volcanoes in Rwanda
São Tomé and Príncipe has only one volcano, Pico de São Tomé
List of volcanoes in South Africa
List of volcanoes in Sudan
List of volcanoes in Tanzania
List of volcanoes in Uganda

Americas 

List of volcanoes in Argentina
List of volcanoes in Bolivia
List of volcanoes in Brazil
List of volcanoes in Canada
List of volcanoes in Chile
List of volcanoes in Colombia
List of volcanoes in Costa Rica
List of volcanoes in Dominica
List of volcanoes in Ecuador
List of volcanoes in El Salvador
List of volcanoes in Grenada
Guadeloupe has only one recognized volcano, La Grande Soufrière
List of volcanoes in Guatemala
List of volcanoes in Hawaii
List of volcanoes in Honduras
List of volcanoes in Martinique
List of volcanoes in Mexico
List of volcanoes in Montserrat
List of volcanoes in Nicaragua
List of volcanoes in Panama
List of volcanoes in Peru
List of volcanoes in Saint Kitts and Nevis
List of volcanoes in Saint Lucia
List of volcanoes in Saint Vincent and the Grenadines
List of volcanoes in the United States
Venezuela has no recognized volcanoes.

Asia 

List of volcanoes in Afghanistan
List of volcanoes in Armenia 
List of volcanoes in Azerbaijan 
List of volcanoes in Cambodia
List of volcanoes in China
List of volcanoes in India
List of volcanoes in Indonesia
List of volcanoes in Iran
The only known volcanoes in Israel are in the Golan Heights.
List of volcanoes in Japan
List of volcanoes in Korea
List of volcanoes in Malaysia
List of volcanoes in Mongolia
List of volcanoes in Myanmar
List of volcanoes in Pakistan
List of volcanoes in the Philippines
List of volcanoes in Saudi Arabia
List of volcanoes in Syria
List of volcanoes in Taiwan
List of volcanoes in Thailand
List of volcanoes in Turkey
List of volcanoes in Vietnam
List of volcanoes in Yemen

Europe 

List of volcanoes in Europe
List of volcanoes in France
List of volcanoes in Germany
List of volcanoes in Georgia (country)
List of volcanoes in Greece
List of volcanoes in Iceland
List of volcanoes in Italy
List of volcanoes in the Netherlands
List of volcanoes in North Macedonia
List of volcanoes in Norway
List of volcanoes in Poland
List of volcanoes in Portugal
List of volcanoes in the Republic of Ireland
The only known volcano in Romania is Ciomadul.
List of volcanoes in Russia (European section)
List of volcanoes in Spain
List of volcanoes in the United Kingdom

Oceania, Atlantic and Pacific Oceans, and Antarctica 

List of volcanoes in Antarctica
List of volcanoes in Ascension Island
List of volcanoes in Australia
List of volcanoes in Fiji
List of volcanoes in French Polynesia
List of volcanoes in French Southern and Antarctic Lands
List of volcanoes in New Zealand
List of volcanoes in the Pacific Ocean
List of volcanoes in Papua New Guinea                                                
List of volcanoes in Solomon Islands
List of volcanoes in South Sandwich Islands
List of volcanoes in Tristan da Cunha
List of volcanoes in Tonga
List of volcanoes in Vanuatu
List of volcanoes in Wallis Islands
List of volcanoes in Samoa

See also 

Global Volcanism Program of the Smithsonian Institution

References

External links

 Global Volcanism Program
Current eruptions
 Volcano World
 Volcano photos by country (geographic.org)

 
Lists of landforms